Questa specie d'amore (aka, This Kind of Love) is a 1972 Italian drama film directed by Alberto Bevilacqua. It is based on the novel with the same name written by Bevilacqua himself. The film was awarded with the David di Donatello for best film and two Nastro d'Argento awards for best screenplay and for best story.

Cast 
Jean Seberg: Giovanna
Ugo Tognazzi: Federico/ Father of  Federico
Ewa Aulin: Isina
Angelo Infanti: Bernardo
Evi Maltagliati: Mother of Federico
Fernando Rey: Father of Giovanna
Marisa Belli

References

External links

1972 films
Films directed by Alberto Bevilacqua
Italian drama films
Films scored by Ennio Morricone
Films based on Italian novels
1972 drama films
1970s Italian-language films
1970s Italian films